Weisz is a Hungarian surname of German and Jewish origin. Notable people with the surname include:

 Árpád Weisz (1896–1944), Hungarian Olympic football player and manager
 Berthold Weisz (born 1845), Hungarian deputy
 Erik Weisz (1874–1926), was a Hungarian-born American magician best known by his stage name "Harry Houdini"
 Ezra Weisz (born 1971), American voice actor
 Ferenc Weisz (1885–1943), Hungarian footballer 
 Franziska Weisz (born 1980), Austrian actress
 Paul B. Weisz (1919–2012), Czechoslovak-born American chemist
 Rachel Weisz (born 1970), English, American actress
 Richárd Weisz (1879–1945), Hungarian Olympic champion Greco-Roman wrestler  
 Spencer Weisz (born 1995), American-Israeli basketball player
 Victor Weisz (1913–1966), German-born Hungarian-British political cartoonist
 Zoni Weisz (born 1937), Dutch Porajmos survivor

German-language surnames
Hungarian-language surnames
Jewish surnames